was a 9-dan Japanese professional Go player.

Biography 

Sakata became a professional Go player in 1935. His first title match was the Hon'inbō in 1951 when he challenged Hashimoto Utaro. More than usual was at stake in the match because Hashimoto played for the Kansai Ki-in, which Hashimoto had founded the year before. This put additional pressure on Sakata to win the title back for the Nihon Ki-in. Sakata started out well, winning three of the first four games, but Hashimoto fought back and won the final four games, and so kept the Hon'inbō title. Afterwards, Sakata went on to win a couple of small titles which were the start of a meteoric run of major wins in which he won almost all of the titles in Japan except the Hon'inbō. In 1961 he was once again the challenger for the Hon'inbō. His opponent, Takagawa Kaku, had held the title for nine years straight. Sakata won the Hon'inbō and held it for seven years in a row. Thus he became an honorary Honinbo, and was later called the 23rd Honinbo, with the name Honinbo Eiju.  During his Honinbo reign, he also won the Meijin title in 1963, making Sakata the first player to simultaneously hold both titles (which at the time were the biggest titles in Japan). Sakata's strongest year was 1964, when he won 30 games and lost only two and held seven major titles: Meijin, Honinbo, Nihon Ki-in Championship, Asahi Pro Best Ten, Oza, Nihon Kiin#1, and NHK Cup. 

Sakata's challenger for the 1965 Meijin was Rin Kaiho, who at the time was just 23 years old. Sakata was the overwhelming favorite, but Rin won the title. Sakata challenged two years in a row but could not win the Meijin back. Rin then went on to take the Hon'inbō from Sakata. Although Sakata suffered defeats for these top titles, he went on to win many other titles, including the Judan and Oza. 

Sakata wrote many books in Japanese; several have been translated into English, including Modern Joseki and Fuseki, The Middle Game of Go, Tesuji and Anti-Suji of Go and Killer of Go.

Sakata died on October 22, 2010 at the age of 90.

Titles and runners-up
Ranks #2 in total number of titles in Japan.

Bibliography
 Modern Joseki and Fuseki, Vol. 1: Parallel Fuseki, Ishi Press 1968, reprinted 2006 
 Modern Joseki and Fuseki, Vol. 2: The Opening Theory of Go, Ishi Press 1971, reprinted 2006 
 The Middle Game of Go or "Chubansen", Ishi Press, 1971,

References

External links 
 http://senseis.xmp.net/?SakataEio
 http://gobase.org/information/players/?pp=Sakata%20Eio
 https://web.archive.org/web/20051217233318/http://www.andromeda.com/people/ddyer/age-summer-94/encounter.html
 http://www.xs4all.nl/~rongen17/Cho/Player/Sakata.html

1920 births
2010 deaths
Japanese Go players
Go (game) writers
Deaths from aortic aneurysm
Persons of Cultural Merit
Recipients of the Medal with Purple Ribbon
Recipients of the Order of the Sacred Treasure, 2nd class